Adam Valdez is visual effects supervisor. Best known for his works on Oscar winning films The Lord of the Rings: The Fellowship of the Ring (2001) and The Lord of the Rings: The Two Towers (2002) as an animation head, though did not get the nomination. Valdez worked as lead visual supervisor in acclaimed films such as 10,000 BC (2008), The Chronicles of Narnia: Prince Caspian (2008), John Carter (2012), World War Z (2013), Maleficent (2014), The Jungle Book (2016) for which he won the Academy Award for Best Visual Effects at 89th Academy Awards. In 2020, he received his second Academy Award nomination for Best Visual Effects for The Lion King (2019).

Filmography

References

External links
 

Living people
Best Visual Effects Academy Award winners
Best Visual Effects BAFTA Award winners
Special effects people
Year of birth missing (living people)